New York City's 24th City Council district is one of 51 districts in the New York City Council. It has been represented by Democrat James F. Gennaro since a 2021 special election to replace fellow Democrat Rory Lancman; Gennaro previously held the seat from 2002 until 2013.

Geography
District 24 covers a series of neighborhoods in central Queens, including some or all of Jamaica, Briarwood, Kew Gardens Hills, Fresh Meadows, Pomonok, Hillcrest, Jamaica Estates, Jamaica Hills, and Parkway Village. The lower half of Flushing Meadows–Corona Park is located within the district.

The district overlaps with Queens Community Boards 7, 8, and 12, and with New York's 5th and 6th congressional districts. It also overlaps with the 10th, 11th, 14th, 15th, and 16th districts of the New York State Senate, and with the 24th, 25th, 27th, 29th, and 32nd districts of the New York State Assembly.

Recent election results

2021
In 2019, voters in New York City approved Ballot Question 1, which implemented ranked-choice voting in all local elections. Under the new system, voters have the option to rank up to five candidates for every local office. Voters whose first-choice candidates fare poorly will have their votes redistributed to other candidates in their ranking until one candidate surpasses the 50 percent threshold. If one candidate surpasses 50 percent in first-choice votes, then ranked-choice tabulations will not occur.

2021 special
In November 2020, Councilman Rory Lancman took a position in the administration of Governor Andrew Cuomo, triggering a special election for his seat in February 2021. Like most municipal special elections in New York City, the race was officially nonpartisan, with all candidates running on ballot lines of their own creation. The election was technically the first in the city's history to utilize ranked-choice voting, but because Gennaro won with a majority in the first round, ranked votes were not counted.

2017

2013

References

New York City Council districts